Picture! Picture! is a Philippine television quiz show broadcast by GMA Network. Hosted by Ryan Agoncillo, it premiered on November 23, 2013. The show concluded on June 15, 2014 with a total of 28 episodes.

Host 

 Ryan Agoncillo
 Choi Da-seul

Gameplay 
A team of four players must answer 10 picture questions successively for a chance to answer the Jackpot Question worth half a million pesos. Each question becomes difficult as the value increases.

The team has 20 seconds to answer each question.

After three questions have been asked, the team must eliminate one team member by answering a kick out question.

Only one player will be left standing after the final kick out question.

If the team fails to reach the Jackpot Round, the accumulated amount will be divided among the remaining team members.

Backups
Save Pic: If the player posted the wrong answer, the team will be asked another question of the same money value.
Twin Picks: The players may post two answers out of the three choices.
Note: The back-ups may be used any time of the game except for the Kickout Question and Jackpot Round.

Kickout Question
Kickout Question is the gameplay of Picture! Picture!. After 3 questions correctly answered, the host will give the question and photo until the saying of "Swipe!". If someone first got the correct answer, he/she has the power to "kickout" a player.

Jackpot Round
Jackpot Round is the last step of P500,000. Every correct photo is worth P10,000.

Money Board:
P10,000
P20,000
P40,000
P60,000
P70,000
P80,000
P100,000
P200,000
P300,000
P500,000 (top prize)

Ratings
According to AGB Nielsen Philippines' Mega Manila household television ratings, the pilot episode of Picture! Picture! earned a 24.4% rating. While the final episode scored an 11.4% rating.

Accolades

References

2013 Philippine television series debuts
2014 Philippine television series endings
Filipino-language television shows
GMA Network original programming
Philippine game shows